Kakavijë (Kakavia) is a community in the Gjirokastër County, southern Albania. At the 2015 local government reform it became part of the municipality Dropull. The village lies near the border crossing of Kakavia/Kakavijë, and is part of the Dropull region. It is inhabited by members of the Greek minority.

References

Populated places in Dropull
Villages in Gjirokastër County
Greek communities in Albania
Villages in Albania